Fahd Abdulmohsen Al-Rasheed is the chief executive officer of the Royal Commission for Riyadh City (RCRC) - the authority responsible for overseeing the capital city of the Kingdom of Saudi Arabia - since November 2019.

Board memberships
Al-Rasheed serves as Chair of several organizations including the King Abdullah Financial District, the Saudi Conventions and Exhibitions General Authority, the King Faisal Specialist Hospital & Research Centre, Central Arriyadh Development Company, and the Integrated Logistics Bonded Zone in Riyadh. He is also the vice-chairman of Prince Mohammad bin Salman College of Business and Entrepreneurship– the first of its kind in the Kingdom – which aims to be an incubator and trainer of business entrepreneurs and future leaders across key sectors (governmental, private sector and civil community foundations). The college was established in collaboration with the Mohamed bin Salman Foundation (MiSK Foundation), Babson International College and Lockheed Martin Corporation.

Al-Rasheed also serves on the boards of multiple organizations including the King Salman Park Foundation, the Sports Boulevard Foundation, the Soudah Development Company, Qiddiya Investment Company, the Diriyah Gate Development Authority, the King Abdullah University of Science and Technology, and the World Economic Forum's Net Zero Carbon Cities.

Career
Prior to RCRC, he was the Group CEO and managing director of King Abdullah Economic City (KAEC) from January 2008 to September 2018, the first publicly-listed city in the world and one of the largest private sector projects globally .
Under Al-Rasheed's leadership, KAEC was responsible for developing one of the largest ports in the world (currently ranked among the largest 100 in the world)  and attracted over 120 leading global and regional companies to establish their industrial compounds, making KAEC the fastest growing logistics and manufacturing hub in the region . Al-Rasheed also spearheaded the development of a significant number of residential, utility and leisure projects that transformed KAEC into one of the leading tourism and residential destinations in the region.

Before joining KAEC, he was the CFO and Deputy Governor of the Saudi Arabian General Investment Authority (now the Ministry of Investment), and was a financial analyst at Saudi Aramco.

Al-Rasheed was honored as a Young Global Leader by the World Economic Forum in 2011.

Education
Al-Rasheed holds a Bachelor's of Science in Business Administration from Washington University in St. Louis and an MBA from the Stanford Business School. He is a graduate of the Advanced Management Program in Real Estate at the Harvard Graduate School of Design.

References

Stanford University Graduate School of Business faculty
Olin Business School (Washington University) alumni
Saudi Arabian chief executives
Chief financial officers
Living people
Year of birth missing (living people)